"Street Called Main" is a song recorded and co-produced by New Zealand-born Australian-American country artist Keith Urban. The song was written by Chris LaCorte, Josh Miller, and Scooter Carusoe. It is the fourth single in Australia off Urban's upcoming twelfth studio album, slated for release in 2023.

Background
When Urban first heard the demo of "Street Called Main", he loved it "right out of the gate," especially for the melody and lyrics. He viewed the song as conveying the idea that "some memories are triggered by the simplest of things, like finding yourself anywhere in the world - even on a 'street called main' - and suddenly 'she' comes flooding back. Urban described the song as "pure ‘open road with the windows down’ nostalgia that just makes you feel good." He recorded the track in Nashville, Tennessee with longtime co-producer Dann Huff.

The single art that features Urban holding a boombox over his head is a tribute to a scene from the 1989 film Say Anything....

Music video
The official music video for "Street Called Main" premiered on November 17, 2022. It was filmed in Portland, Oregon, and was directed by Justin Key, marking his first collaboration with Urban.

Credits and personnel
Adapted from AllMusic.

 Ethan Barrette – second engineer
 Drew Bollman – engineer
 Scooter Carusoe – composition
 Mark Dobson – recording
 Dann Huff – acoustic guitar, electric guitar, production
 David Huff – programming
 Scott Johnson – production coordination
 Charlie Judge – keyboards
 David Kalmusky – engineer
 Chris LaCorte –  composition
 Joe LaPorta – mastering engineer
 Rob McNelley – electric guitar
 Josh Miller – composition
 Justin Niebank – engineer, mixing
 Sofie Pederson – assistant engineer
 Josh Reedy – backing vocals
 Jimmy Lee Sloas – bass guitar
 Aaron Sterling –  drums
 Conner Theriot – assistant engineer
 Keith Urban –  acoustic guitar, electric guitar, production, lead vocals, backing vocals

Charts

References

2022 singles
2022 songs
Keith Urban songs
Songs written by Scooter Carusoe
Song recordings produced by Dann Huff